Geoffrey Chevalier Cheshire,  (27 June 1886 – 27 October 1978) was a British barrister, scholar, and influential writer on law. He was the father of Leonard Cheshire, the British war hero and founder of the Cheshire Foundation Homes for the Sick.

Biography
Born in 1886 to Walter Christopher Cheshire, of Northwich, Cheshire, a solicitor (also Registrar of Northwich County Court) and Major (Honorary Lieutenant Colonel) of the 3rd Volunteer Battalion, Cheshire Regiment, and Clara (née Cook), he was educated at Denstone College and Merton College, Oxford, obtaining a first class honours degree in Jurisprudence in 1908.

He received a Lectureship in Law at the University College of Wales, Aberystwyth, working for Professor T.A. Levi, but returned to Oxford in 1911, where he was elected to a fellowship in law at Exeter College in 1912.

He served in the First World War, 1914–19, with 2/6 Battalion Cheshire Regt. and the Royal Flying Corps: he retired with the rank of captain.

He became a barrister (Lincoln's Inn) in 1922 and, in the same year took on the additional office of All Souls' Lecturer in Private International Law. He was All Souls reader in English Law, from 1933, and a fellow of All Souls College, Oxford, from 1944 to 1949. In 1944 he was elected Vinerian Professor of English Law and there followed a succession of other honours: honorary bencher of Lincoln's Inn (1944); honorary Fellow of Merton College, Oxford (1945); honorary Fellow of Exeter College, Oxford; honorary LLD London and Manchester; and Fellow of the British Academy.

He married Burella Primrose Eleanor Barstow, daughter of Lieutenant Colonel Thomas Anderson Adam Barstow, on 6 February 1915. They had two children: (Geoffrey) Leonard Cheshire and Christopher Cheshire, who was also a wartime pilot. In 1963, a year after the death of his first wife, Geoffrey Cheshire married Dame Mary Lloyd (1902–1972), daughter of A.J. Lloyd, and a former Director of the WRNS. Geoffrey Cheshire outlived his second wife as well, and died in 1978, aged 92.

Contribution to Law
Geoffrey Cheshire's obituary in The Times described him as "the first academic lawyer to tackle the great reforms in the law of property associated with the name of Lord Birkenhead", and his first book, Modern Law of Real Property, published initially in 1925, became the standard text on the subject. This work has remained in print ever since and, updated by Burn and Cartwright, is now in its 17th edition. (Modern Law of Real Property, E.H. Burn & J.H.Cartwright, O,U.P. 17th Ed. 2006). Generations of students have also studied "The Law of Contract", first written in conjunction with the legal historian C. H. S. Fifoot in 1945, and in its 15th Edition (Law of Contract, Cheshire, Fifoot and Furmston, O.U.P., 15th Ed. 2007).

Works

References
 
 The Times, 28 October 1978, Obituary: Professor G.C. Cheshire—Influential writer on the law

1886 births
1978 deaths
Military personnel from Cheshire
Cheshire Regiment
British Army personnel of World War I
People educated at Denstone College
Alumni of Merton College, Oxford
Fellows of Exeter College, Oxford
Fellows of All Souls College, Oxford
People from Northwich
Fellows of the British Academy
Royal Flying Corps officers
Members of Lincoln's Inn
English barristers
English legal scholars
Vinerian Professors of English Law
Place of death missing
20th-century English lawyers